The NWA Women's Pacific/NEO Single Championship was a women's professional wrestling championship contested primarily in NEO Japan Ladies Pro-Wrestling.

Being a professional wrestling championship, it was not won via direct competition; it was instead won via a predetermined ending to a match or awarded to a wrestler because of a wrestling angle. There were a total of 23 reigns by 13 wrestlers. The first champion was Yoshiko Tamura, who defeated Nicole Bass to win the title. The title was retired on May 25, 2011, after NEO had closed its doors.

Title history

Combined reigns

References 

Women's professional wrestling championships
NEO Japan Ladies Pro Wrestling championships
National Wrestling Alliance championships
Regional professional wrestling championships